Georg Henschel may refer to:

 Georg Christian Carl Henschel, founder of Henschel & Son
 George Henschel (Isidor Georg Henschel), musician